This is a partial chronological list of cases decided by the United States Supreme Court during the tenures of Chief Justices John Jay (October 19, 1789 – June 29, 1795), John Rutledge (August 12, 1795 – December 28, 1795), and Oliver Ellsworth (March 8, 1796 – December 15, 1800), respectively the Jay, Rutledge, and Ellsworth Courts.

Jay Court

Rutledge Court

Ellsworth Court

References 

List
List
List